Jaumave is a town and a municipality located in the Mexican state of Tamaulipas.

External links
Gobierno Municipal de Jaumave Official website

Municipalities of Tamaulipas